Demetrius Lee Stewart (born June 21, 1981), better known by his stage name Shawty Redd, is an American record producer and rapper. He is cited as one of the pioneers of the production style which would become synonymous with the trap subgenre.

Discography

Production style 
Shawty Redd is known for his traditional trap style and ominous, horror-influenced melodies and chord progressions.  A good example of this is his production on Trap House and Let's Get It: Thug Motivation 101.  He can also compose melodic instrumentals similar to his work on Snoop Dogg's "Sensual Seduction".

Murder charge 
In 2010 Redd shot and killed long term collaborator Damon Martin at Redd's house in Atlanta. Redd was charged with murder but acquitted after the judge ruled Redd acted in self defense.

Awards and nominations 

!
|-
|align=center|2008
|"Sensual Seduction"
|Grammy Award for Best Rap Song
|
|

References

External links 
 
 

1983 births
1017 Brick Squad artists
African-American male rappers
African-American record producers
American electronic musicians
American hip hop record producers
American rhythm and blues keyboardists
Living people
Rappers from Atlanta
Songwriters from Georgia (U.S. state)
Southern hip hop musicians
Trap musicians
21st-century American rappers
21st-century American male musicians
African-American songwriters
21st-century African-American musicians
20th-century African-American people
American male songwriters